The 2015-16 Ethiopian Premier League is the 69th season of top-tier football in Ethiopia. The season began on 28 October 2015. Saint George SC were the defending champions, having won their 24th championship.

Teams

A total of 14 teams contested the league, including 12 sides from the 2014–15 season and two promoted from the National League. The two newcomers were Dire Dawa City and Hadiya Hossana FC. The teams finishing in the bottom two places were relegated to the National League for 2015-16.

Muger Cement and Woldia City were the last two teams of the 2014–15 season and play in the National League for the 2015-16 season. Saint George SC are the defending champions from the 2014–15 season.

League table

References

Ethiopian Premier League
Ethiopian Premier League
Premier League
Premier League